Stephen James King (born 13 August 1983) is an Australian TV and stage actor.

Life and career 
A graduate of the Newtown High School of the Performing Arts, Sydney. 

King leapt into the public eye on serial Home and Away in the  regular role as Edward Dunglass in 1999. He then guest starred on the popular Sci-Fi series Farscape in 2004, and then performed on stage with the Sydney Theatre Company and Belvoir Street Theatre as a teenager.

At the age of 20, King was accepted into the prestigious Juilliard School in New York City. Since graduating in 2008, he has appeared on stage at the New York Shakespeare Festival AKA Shakespeare in the Park with Sam Waterston, Lauren Ambrose and Michael Stuhlbarg, New York Theatre Workshop with Tim Robbins and at the Tony Award winning McCarter Theater, Princeton. In 2008, he guest starred on ABC's Life on Mars with Harvey Keitel. He then returned to the theatre, appearing in plays such as Neil LaBute's Reasons To Be Pretty. In 2014, he co-created with Michael Demosthenous, Little Bondi short film, that was selected for Tropfest an international short film festival.

Filmography

Film

Television

References

External links

1983 births
Australian male television actors
Living people